Nishan was a Polabian Slavic tribe that inhabited the basin of Elbe river near Dresden. They most likely were in the union with Glomatian tribe. They were conquered by Holy Roman Empire between 928 and 929, and their lands were incorporated into the Margravate of Meissen.

Notes

References

Bibliography 
 Lech Leciejewicz (red.), Mały słownik kultury dawnych Słowian. Warsaw. Wiedza Powszechna. 1998. ISBN 83-214-0499-5.
 James Westfall Thompson. Feudal Germany, Volume II. New York. Frederick Ungar Publishing Co. 1928.

Polabian Slavs
9th century in East Francia
10th century in East Francia